William Robert Poage (December 28, 1899 – January 3, 1987) was a Texas politician who was won election to the United States House of Representatives 21 times, serving 42 years.

Early life and education

William Robert "Bob" Poage was born in Waco, Texas to William Allen and Helen Wheeler (Née Conger) and was raised near Woodson.  He attended the schools of Throckmorton County, and during World War I served as an apprentice seaman in the United States Navy.  He attended the University of Texas at Austin and the University of Colorado Boulder before receiving a Bachelor of Arts degree from Baylor University in 1921.  He farmed and taught geology at Baylor before attending Baylor Law School, from which he received his LL.B. in 1924.  Poage practiced law in Waco and taught at Baylor Law.

Political career

A Democrat, he served in the Texas House of Representatives from 1925 to 1929, and the Texas State Senate from 1931 to 1937.

In 1936, Poage was elected to the House of Representatives. He was later diagnosed with Ménière's disease, which eventually left him deaf in one ear. In the House, he supported acts designed to help the rural residents of his district. He supported the farm price supports of the Roosevelt Administration, and worked to keep farmers prosperous. Poage was the chairman of the Committee on Agriculture from 1967 to 1975, until he was removed from his position in a revolt by House Democratic Caucus against the Seniority system. The Caucus considered Poage to be too conservative and he was replaced by Tom Foley (D-WA), a future Speaker of the House.

He was one of the majority of the Texan delegation to decline to sign the 1956 Southern Manifesto opposing the desegregation of public schools ordered by the Supreme Court in Brown v. Board of Education. However, Poage voted against the Civil Rights Acts of 1957, 1960, 1964, and 1968, as well as the 24th Amendment to the U.S. Constitution and the Voting Rights Act of 1965. And, when lobbied by the Johnson administration to support the War on Poverty legislation for the opportunities and services it would provide, Poage responded, "Oh, I see! You're talking' about the niggers!"

Retirement and death

Poage did not run for re-election in 1978 and retired on December 31, 1978, 4 days before the official end of his 21st term in office. He returned to his home in Waco, Texas. The following year the W. R. Poage Legislative Library for Graduate Studies and Research was dedicated on the Baylor University Campus to house Poage's congressional papers and the papers of eight other former U. S. Congressmen. On January 3, 1987, he died of heart failure at 87 years old after receiving open heart surgery.

References

External links

 WR Poage at Oakwood Cemetery (Waco, Texas)

1899 births
1987 deaths
People from Waco, Texas
Farmers from Texas
Baylor University alumni
Baylor Law School alumni
Baylor University faculty
Burials at Oakwood Cemetery (Waco, Texas)
University of Texas at Austin alumni
Texas lawyers
Democratic Party members of the Texas House of Representatives
Democratic Party Texas state senators
United States Navy sailors
United States Navy personnel of World War I
Military personnel from Texas
Democratic Party members of the United States House of Representatives from Texas
20th-century American politicians
20th-century American lawyers